The Top Ten Money Making Stars Poll were polls on determining the bankability of movie stars. They began quite early in the movie history. At first, they were popular polls and contests conducted in film magazines, where the readers would vote for their favorite stars, like the poll published in New York Morning Telegraph on 17 December 1911. Magazines appeared and disappeared often and among the most consistent in those early days were the polls in the Motion Picture Magazine.

Though this and numerous other magazines, like Photoplay, continued with this type of poll, the standards for the polling were set by the Quigley Publishing Company. They published a poll, which became known as the "Top Ten Money Making Stars Poll", from a questionnaire sent to movie exhibitors every year between 1915 and 2013 by Quigley Publishing Company. The list was based on a poll of movie theater owners, who were asked to name who they felt were the previous year's top 10 money-making stars. The Top 10 Poll, which appeared annually in Quigley's Motion Picture Herald and The Motion Picture Almanac, was long regarded as one of the most reliable barometers of a movie star's box-office power, as film exhibitors base their decisions on one economic criterion: those stars who will bring patrons into their theaters.

For the 1915–1924 period, the list was compiled from 200,000 exhibitor reports, published in the "What the Picture Did for Me" department in 520 weekly editions of the Exhibitors Herald magazine. The first version of the questionnaire, specifically made for the exhibitors to vote for the money-makers, was used from 1925 to 1931. It included voting for both the box office films and the stars. A standardized questionnaire specifically for choosing the biggest box office stars was used since 1933.

Records

Poll results by year 

 1912
 1916
 1921
 1926
 1931
 1936
 1941
 1946
 1951
 1956
 1961
 1966
 1971
 1976
 1981
 1986
 1991
 1996
 2001
 2006
 2011

Select top 25 lists
In addition to the top ten stars for that year, the Quigley Poll would commonly list the next 15 stars as well. A sample of these, including some of the predecessors' lists, are below:

 1912
 1928
 1935
 1940
 1945
 1950
 1955
 1960
 1965
 1970
 1975
 1980
 1985
 1990
 1995
 2000

Other listings for 1933: 28) Ann Harding, 29) Marlene Dietrich, 30) Greta Garbo, 32) John Barrymore, 46) Walter Huston, 57) Ruth Chatterton, 67) Leslie Howard, 86) Kate Smith 
Random ratings for 1934: 29) Greta Garbo, 57) Marlene Dietrich, 60) Charles Farrell, 64) Constance Bennett, 96) Maurice Chevalier

Top ten Western stars
For a number of years, there was also a poll for the top ten Western stars in the United States.

Top Ten Money Makers in Britain
The Motion Picture Herald published a similar list for the UK, listing the most popular stars at the British box office, including the most popular British stars.

 

*Another poll by Sidney L. Bernstein of his theatre group listed these actors.

 In 1967, Sean Connery was voted most popular male star and Julie Christie most popular female star.

 In 1972, Sean Connery was voted most popular male star, followed by Clint Eastwood and Gene Hackman.

Top Stars in France
Various polls have been taken for the top stars in France too.

Box Office Poison
In 1938 a list was published of stars who were considered "box office poison" by exhibitors. The list was from Harry Brandt of the Independent Theater Owners Association.

The stars included:
Edward Arnold
Fred Astaire
John Barrymore
James Cagney
Joan Crawford
Dolores del Río
Marlene Dietrich
Kay Francis
Greta Garbo
Katharine Hepburn
Norma Shearer
Mae West

Varietys Over Priced Stars of 1968
In 1968 Variety magazine published a list of ten stars it considered overpriced. The stars charged at least $250,000 a film and had at least four flops in a row recently:

 Brigitte Bardot
 Marlon Brando
 Yul Brynner
 Tony Curtis
 Glenn Ford
 James Garner
 William Holden
 Rock Hudson
 Anthony Quinn
 Natalie Wood

Notes

References

Cinemas and movie theaters
Lists of actors
Polling
Film box office